Pennsylvania Leadership Conference is an annual two-day conference organized by the Pennsylvania Leadership Council of Pennsylvania conservative activists in Harrisburg, Pennsylvania. Due to coronavirus pandemic, 2020's conference will proceed as a virtual one.

History 
The Pennsylvania Leadership Conference was founded in 1989 by a group of conservative activists, including Charlie Gerow, Susan Staub, Jim Panyard, Don Eberly, and John Fluharty, seeking to strengthen the conservative "grassroots lobby" in Pennsylvania. The first conference attracted 300 attendees and featured speakers including Congressmen Robert Smith Walker and Newt Gingrich and State Representatives Joseph R. Pitts and Howard L. Fargo. The Philadelphia Inquirer described it as an "anti-left nirvana." The conference was scheduled during the Republican State Committee of Pennsylvania meeting in Erie, leading commentators to speculate that it was intended to drain support from eventual Republican nominee for Pennsylvania Governor Barbara Hafer because of her pro-choice stance. However, conference organizers denied such an ulterior motive.

Conference presidents and speakers 
Following the first meeting, the Pennsylvania Leadership Council was founded to coordinate the conference's annual organization, with Lowman S. Henry serving as president. Later presidents included Sean Duffy and Gorden Blain. Speakers at the Pennsylvania Leadership Conference have included M. Stanton Evans, Bill Bennett, Robert Novak, Alan Keyes, Lynne Cheney, Armstrong Williams, Walter Williams, John Gizzi, and David Horowitz.

References

External links
Pennsylvania Leadership Conference homepage

Political conferences
Politics of Pennsylvania
Conservatism in the United States
Organizations based in Harrisburg, Pennsylvania
Conventions in Pennsylvania
1989 establishments in Pennsylvania